The 2011–12 season was Associazione Calcio Siena's 106th in existence and 8th season in the top flight of Italian football, Serie A.

Season report

Coach

First Team
Players and squad numbers last updated on 30 May 2012.
Note: Flags indicate national team as has been defined under FIFA eligibility rules. Players may hold more than one non-FIFA nationality.

Transfers
For a list of all A.C. Siena transfers, see List of Italian football transfers winter 2011–12, List of Italian football transfers summer 2011 (July), List of Italian football transfers summer 2011 (August), List of Italian football transfers summer 2011 (co-ownership)

Statistics

Goals and appearances
Substitute appearances off of the bench appear only in parentheses.
{| class="wikitable" style="text-align:center"
|-
!rowspan="2" valign="bottom"|No.
!rowspan="2" valign="bottom"|Pos.
!rowspan="2" valign="bottom"|Name
!colspan="2" width="85"|League
!colspan="2" width="85"|Coppa Italia
!colspan="2" width="85"|Total
!colspan="2" width="85"|Discipline
|-
!Apps
!Goals
!Apps
!Goals
!Apps
!Goals
!
!
|-
|align=left|1||align=left|GK||align=left| Željko Brkić
|18||0||2||0||20||0||1||0
|-
|align=left|2||align=left|DF||align=left| Roberto Vitiello
|33||1||1(1)||0||34(1)||1||7||0
|-
|align=left|3||align=left|DF||align=left| Cristiano Del Grosso
|31(1)||2||1||0||32(1)||2||7||0
|-
|align=left|5||align=left|MF||align=left| Paul Codrea
|0(1)||0||1(1)||0||1(2)||0||0||0
|-
|align=left|6||align=left|MF||align=left| Ângelo
|7(6)||0||5||2||12(6)||2||1||0
|-
|align=left|7||align=left|MF||align=left| Luigi Giorgi
|12(1)||1||0(1)||0||12(2)||1||3||0
|-
|align=left|7||align=left|MF||align=left| Gennaro Troianiello
|0||0||2||0||2||0||0||0
|-
|align=left|8||align=left|MF||align=left| Simone Vergassola
|23(6)||0||2||0||25(6)||0||3||0
|-
|align=left|9||align=left|FW||align=left| Marcelo Larrondo
|6(8)||1||2(2)||0||8(10)||1||3||0
|-
|align=left|10||align=left|MF||align=left|  Gaetano D'Agostino
|19(5)||3||2||1||21(5)||8||7||0
|-
|align=left|11||align=left|FW||align=left| Emanuele Calaiò
|24(1)||11||1||1||25(1)||12||5||0
|-
|align=left|12||align=left|GK||align=left| Simone Farelli
|1||0||2||0||3||0||0||0
|-
|align=left|13||align=left|DF||align=left| Luca Rossettini
|30(1)||1||2||0||32(1)||1||11||0
|-
|align=left|14||align=left|MF||align=left| Alessandro Gazzi
|31(2)||1||2||0||33(2)||1||7||0
|-
|align=left|15||align=left|DF||align=left| Nicola Belmonte
|1(1)||0||4||0||5(1)||0||0||0
|-
|align=left|17||align=left|MF||align=left| Paolo Grossi
|9(8)||1||2||0||11(8)||1||1||1
|-
|align=left|18||align=left|FW||align=left| Pablo González
|5(11)||1||3(1)||2||8(12)||3||1||0
|-
|align=left|19||align=left|DF||align=left| Claudio Terzi
|33(2)||1||2(1)||0||35(3)||1||12||0
|-
|align=left|20||align=left|MF||align=left| Joel Acosta
|0||0||0||0||0||0||0||0
|-
|align=left|21||align=left|DF||align=left| Andrea Rossi
|7(3)||0||5||0||12(3)||0||7||0
|-
|align=left|22||align=left|FW||align=left| Mattia Destro
|26(4)||12||1(1)||1||27(5)||13||5||0
|-
|align=left|23||align=left|FW||align=left| Franco Brienza
|34(2)||4||2(1)||0||36(3)||4||4||1
|-
|align=left|25||align=left|GK||align=left| Gianluca Pegolo
|19||0||2||0||21||0||1||1
|-
|align=left|26||align=left|DF||align=left| Emanuele Pesoli
|7(2)||0||4||0||11(2)||0||4||0
|-
|align=left|33||align=left|DF||align=left| Gabriele Angella
|0||0||0(2)||0||0(2)||0||0||0
|-
|align=left|36||align=left|MF||align=left| Francesco Bolzoni
|8(8)||1||2(2)||0||10(10)||1||2||0
|-
|align=left|55||align=left|MF||align=left| Francesco Parravicini
|1(8)||0||3(1)||0||4(9)||0||3||0
|-
|align=left|70||align=left|MF||align=left| Daniele Mannini
|12(9)||0||3||0||15(9)||0||4||0
|-
|align=left|77||align=left|MF||align=left| Alessio Sestu
|1(4)||0||0(3)||0||1(7)||0||1||0
|-
|align=left|80||align=left|DF||align=left| Matteo Contini
|12(4)||0||4||0||16(4)||0||4||0
|-
|align=left|81||align=left|FW||align=left| Erjon Bogdani
|4(7)||4||1(1)||0||5(8)||4||0||0
|-
|align=left|83||align=left|FW||align=left| Reginaldo
|4(9)||0||5||3||9(9)||3||1||0
|-

Top scorers
Includes all competitive matches. The list is sorted by shirt number when total goals are equal.

{| class="wikitable" style="font-size: 95%; text-align: center;"
|-
!width=15|
!width=15|
!width=15|
!width=15|
!width=150|Name
!width=80|Serie A
!width=80|Coppa Italia
!width=80|Total
|-
|1
|22
|ST
|
|Mattia Destro
|12
|1
|13
|-
|2
|10
|ST
|
|Emanuele Calaiò
|11
|1
|12
|-
|3
|10
|CM
|
|Gaetano D'Agostino
|3
|1
|4
|-
|"
|23
|FW
|
|Franco Brienza
|4
|0
|4
|-
|"
|81
|ST
|
|Erjon Bogdani
|4
|0
|4
|-

Most appearances
Includes all competitive matches.

{| class="wikitable" style="font-size: 95%; text-align: center;"
|-
!width=15|
!width=15|
!width=15|
!width=15|
!width=150|Name
!width=80|Serie A
!width=80|Coppa Italia
!width=80|Total
|-
|1
|23
|FW
|
|Franco Brienza
|36
|3
|39
|-
|2
|19
|CB
|
|Claudio Terzi
|35
|3
|38
|-
|3
|14
|MF
|
|Alessandro Gazzi
|33
|2
|35
|-
|4
|2
|RB
|
|Roberto Vitiello
|33
|1
|34
|-
|5
|4
|LB
|
| Cristiano Del Grosso
|32
|1
|33
|-
|"
|13
|CB
|
| Luca Rossettini
|31
|2
|33
|-

Club
Coaching staff

Competitions

Overall

Serie A

League table

Results summary

Matches
The fixtures for the 2011–12 Serie A season were announced by the Lega Serie A on 27 July.

Coppa Italia

References

A.C.N. Siena 1904 seasons
Siena